Elizabeth Bay is a mining town in southern coast of Namibia, 25 km south of Lüderitz. It was formerly considered a ghost town. Diamonds were first discovered in the region around 1908; however, it wasn't until 1989 that the government of Namibia spent $53 million on the exploration and creation of a new diamond mine on the site. The mine had a projected life-span of ten years and was expected to produce 2.5 million cts of diamonds. The mine was officially opened by Sam Nujoma on 2 August 1991 and stopped being operational sometime around 1998. By 2000, the town was considered a ghost town and tours were run through it by Kolmanskop.

In 2005 it was announced that the mine would be expanded, thus furthering its lifespan by eight years. The mine is currently operated by Namdeb Diamond Corp. It is owned jointly by De Beers and the Namibia Government. As of 2009 the Elizabeth Bay mine was operating at a $76 million loss. 

Elizabeth Bay is home to forty percent of the world's Cape fur seals.

Media

The derelict theater building in Elizabeth Bay was filmed in a 2010 episode of Life After People: The Series which was mainly featuring Kolmanskop, another ghost town approximately 30 km north of Elizabeth Bay. The episode focused on the effects of wind and sand upon the various run-down buildings and displayed rooms that were filled with sand.

Climate

See also 
 Kolmanskop
 Pomona

References 

Ghost towns in Africa
Former populated places in Namibia